Derek Chisora vs Tyson Fury II, billed as The Fight for the Right and Bad Blood, was a professional boxing match contested between European and WBO International heavyweight champion, Derek Chisora, and Tyson Fury, with the vacant British heavyweight title also on the line. The fight was a WBO "eliminator", with the winner becoming the mandatory challenger for the WBO heavyweight title, held at the time by Wladimir Klitschko. The bout took place on 29 November 2014 at the ExCel, with Fury winning by corner retirement in the tenth round.

Background
Chisora and Fury first fought in 2011, with Chisora defending his British and Commonwealth titles at Wembley Arena, both men went into the fight with a record of 14–0. Fury won by unanimous decision with scores of 117–112, 117–112, and 118–111.

On 8 January 2014, it was announced that Chisora and Fury would fight in interim bouts on 15 February 2014, at the Copper Box Arena, setting up a potential rematch between the two in the summer. Following both their original opponents Andriy Rudenko and Gonzalo Omar Basile pulling out, Chisora and Fury were scheduled to face replacement opponents Kevin Johnson and Joey Abell. Chisora defeated Johnson, winning by unanimous decision, and Fury defeated Abell via 4th-round TKO.

Chisora and Fury were due to meet for a second time on 26 July 2014, at the Manchester Arena. On 21 July, Chisora was forced to pull out after sustaining a fractured hand in training. Chisora's sparring partner, Alexander Ustinov was lined up as Chisora's replacement. Fury pulled out of the fight after his uncle and former trainer Hughie Fury was taken seriously ill. Fury and Chisora rescheduled the rematch for 29 November 2014 at ExCeL.

The fight
From the opening bell, Chisora struggled with Fury's height, reach and movement. Unable to apply pressure and close the range, failing to land any significant punches, and due to Fury's unorthodox fighting style, ended up hitting him below the belt. Chisora was warned twice by referee Marcus McDonnell in the first round. In the second, Fury switched from orthodox and boxed out of a southpaw stance for the majority of the fight, momentarily reverting back to his traditional right-handed stance as the rounds progressed. Fury used his jab and fast punches to outbox Chisora, keeping on the outside, creating a distance with his longer reach, winning the rounds clearly until trainer Don Charles had seen enough and pulled Chisora out at the end of the tenth round.

Aftermath
Following Fury's win, in the post-fight interview, Fury said "Wladimir Klitschko, I'm coming for you, baby. I'm coming. No turning back now, no retreat, no surrender." Fury's uncle and trainer Peter Fury also confirmed Fury would fight once more before challenging Klitschko for the world title. Christian Hammer was later announced as Fury's opponent and the fight took place on 28 February 2015 at the O2 Arena. Fury won the fight via 8th round RTD. After the fight, Fury called out Klitschko again, stating he was ready for his world title shot next.

Fury defeated Klitschko on 28 November, by unanimous decision to capture the unified WBA (Super), IBF, WBO, IBO and The Ring titles. Fury's upset victory ended Klitschko's reign of nearly 10 years, the second longest in heavyweight history.

Fight card

Broadcasting

References 

Boxing matches
Boxing matches involving Tyson Fury
2014 in boxing
2014 in British sport
November 2014 sports events in the United Kingdom
2014 sports events in London